Bickelhaupt Arboretum (14 acres) is a non-profit arboretum located in Clinton, Iowa. It is open dawn to dusk daily without charge.

The arboretum was established by Bob and Frances Bickelhaupt around their home and given to the public in 1970. The Bickelhaupts grouped tree plantings by genus. Major collections include maple (Acer), birch (Betula), hickory (Carya), beech (Fagus), ash (Fraxinus), honeylocust (Gleditsia), magnolia (Magnolia), ornamental crabapple (Malus), oak (Quercus), linden (Tilia) and elm (Ulmus). Other specimens include alders (Alnus), pecan (Carya illinoinensis), hackberry (Celtis occidentalis), dogwoods (Cornus), ginkgo (Ginkgo biloba), thornless honeylocust (Gleditsia triacanthos var. inermis), Kentucky coffeetree (Gymnocladus dioicus), black tupelo (Nyssa), swamp white oak (Quercus bicolor), willows (Salix), and baldcypress (Taxodium). The arboretum also includes outstanding conifer specimens of spruce, pine, fir, douglas fir and larch.

The arboretum's collection of garden conifers contains over 600 accessions from 14 genera hardy in USDA Hardiness Zones 4a to 6a, each labeled with botanical and common names. These including over 100 one-of-a-kind Witches' Brooms, of which 3 are naturally occurring. The arboretum also includes a selection of ornamental shrubs with major collections including boxwood (Buxus), hydrangea, roses (Rosa), lilacs (Syringa), and viburnum.

The arboretum's grounds also include a butterfly garden, a country garden, a daylily (Hemerocallis) collection (including 54 Stout Medal winners), the Mercy Hospice Herb Garden (featuring more than 60 herb specimens), the National Hosta Display Garden (featuring over 200 cultivars), perennials, prairie grasses, a rock garden and a wildflower garden.

See also 
 List of botanical gardens in the United States

External links
Bickelhaupt Arboretum

Arboreta in Iowa
Botanical gardens in Iowa
Protected areas of Clinton County, Iowa
Clinton, Iowa
1970 establishments in Iowa
Protected areas established in 1970